The Immediate Geographic Region of Passos is one of the 10 immediate geographic regions in the Intermediate Geographic Region of Varginha, one of the 70 immediate geographic regions in the Brazilian state of Minas Gerais and one of the 509 of Brazil, created by the National Institute of Geography and Statistics (IBGE) in 2017.

Municipalities 
It comprises 15 municipalities.

 Alpinópolis     
 Bom Jesus da Penha     
 Capetinga     
 Carmo do Rio Claro     
 Cássia     
 Claraval     
 Delfinópolis    
 Fortaleza de Minas     
 Guapé    
 Ibiraci     
 Itaú de Minas    
 Passos     
 Pratápolis   
 São João Batista do Glória     
 São José da Barra

References 

Geography of Minas Gerais